Raúl Borrás (1933–1985) was an Argentine politician, who served as minister of defense during the presidency of Raúl Alfonsín.

References

Defense ministers of Argentina
Radical Civic Union politicians
1933 births
1985 deaths